Phytoptidae is a family of mites belonging to the order Trombidiformes.

Genera

Genera:
 Acathrix Keifer, 1962
 Anchiphytoptus Keifer, 1952
 Austracus Keifer, 1944
 Boczekella Farkas, 1965
 Borassia Chetverikov & Craemer, 2017
 Calycophthora Sorauer, 1886
 Fragariocoptes Roivainen, 1951
 Loboquintus Chetverikov & Petanovic, 2013
 Mackiella Keifer, 1939
 Nalepella Keifer, 1944
 Neopropilus Huang, 1992
 Neoprothrix Reis & Navia, 2014
 Novophytoptus Roivainen, 1947
 Oziella Amrine, Stasny & Flechtmann, 2003
 Palmiphytoptus Navia & Flechtmann, 2002
 Pentaporca Huang, 1996
 Pentasetacus Schliesske, 1985
 Phantacrus Keifer, 1965
 Phytoptus Dujardin, 1851
 Propilus Keifer, 1975
 Prothrix Keifer, 1965
 Retracrus Keifer, 1965
 Setoptus Keifer, 1944
 Sierraphytoptus Keifer, 1939
 Trisetacus Keifer, 1952

References

Trombidiformes
Acari families